TCRF may refer to:

The Cutting Room Floor (website), a website for cataloguing and documenting unused and debug content in video games.
The Tower Cancer Research Foundation